Shihura Khurd Kalan is a village and a Panchayat in Block -Khutar, Shahjahanpur district in the Indian state of Uttar Pradesh. Lucknow is the state capital for Sihura Khurd Kalan village. It is located around 186.4 kilometer away from Sihura Khurd Kalan.. The other nearest state capital from Sihura Khurd Kalan is Delhi and its distance is 350.2 km. The other surrounding state capitals are Lucknow 175.0 km., Dehradun 307.8 km., Chandigarh 439.1 km. The surrounding nearby villages and its distance from sihura are mahua mania 1 km, Longapur 1 km, Mohanpur 2 km, Moradpur niviya kheda, bakundhapur 1 km, Punoutee 1.5 KMDhakna lahiya 5 km etc.

Shihura Gram Punchayat Bhavan 

Shihura is a gram panchayat in which six villages are located. The names of the villages are Shihura Khurd Kalan, Mahua Mainiya, Baikundhapur, Hitouti, Dalippur and Kohanpu. The total population of Shihura Gram Punchayat is 1749. 
Gram puchayat bhavan is near to the sabzi bazaar  and temple. Many problems and policies are discussed in gram panchayat bhavan.

Gram Pradhan list 
 Mr. Ram Ratan Lal Dixit (1991 to 1996) 
 Mr. Mohan LaL (ex. pradhan) (1996 to 2001)
 Mr. Ram Avatar Kushwaha (ex. pradhan) (2001 to 2006)
 Mr. Harbhajan Singh (ex. pradhan) (2006 to 2011)
 Mrs. Rekha Devi w/o Deepu Singh (ex. pradhan) (2011 to 2016)
 Mr. Rishi Pal (Current Pradhan) (from 2016)

Geography
It has an average elevation of 169 metres (531 feet). Dudhwa National Park is 60 km away and Gola Gokhran Nath (Chota Kashi) is 32 km away.

The latitude 28.2761211028683 and longitude 80.25268292374676 are the geocoordinate of sihura.

Demographics
 India census, Shihura had a population of 1183 and category wise there are 340 in SC, 643 in OBC and remaining 200 in General category . Males constitute 56.49% of the population and females 43.51%. Shihura has an average literacy rate of 22%, lower than the national average of 59.5%: male literacy is 58%, and female literacy is 32%. In Shihura  18% of the population is under 6 years of age.

School and educational institutes 

In this Village, there are only two schools: Primary School and Junior High School.

Sabzi Bazaar and Temple 
There is Sabzi Bazaar, arranged by Mr. Ramratan Lal Dixit (ex. pradhan). and a temple which is also built  by Mr. Ramratan Lal Dixit (ex. pradhan)

References

Bazaars in India
Cities and towns in Shahjahanpur district
Retail markets in India